Major-General Barry Michael Lane  (10 August 1932 – 30 January 2022) was a British Army officer.

Military career
Educated at Dover College, Lane was commissioned into the Somerset Light Infantry in 1954. He became commanding officer of the 1st Battalion, The Light Infantry in 1972. He went on to be commander 11th Armoured Brigade in 1977, Deputy Director, Army Staff Duties at the Ministry of Defence in 1980 and Director, Army Quartering at the Ministry of Defence in 1981. After that he became Vice Quartermaster-General in 1982 and General Officer Commanding South West District in 1984 before retiring in 1987.

He was appointed a Companion of the Order of the Bath in the 1984 New Year Honours.

After retirement from the army he became Chief Executive of Cardiff Bay Development Corporation.

In 1956 he married Eveline Jean Koelle; they had one son and one daughter. After the death of his first wife, he married Shirley Ann Hawtin.

He died from Parkinson's disease on 30 January 2022, at the age of 89.

References

 

1932 births
2022 deaths
People educated at Dover College
Companions of the Order of the Bath
Officers of the Order of the British Empire
British Army major generals
Somerset Light Infantry officers
Somerset and Cornwall Light Infantry officers
The Light Infantry officers
Deaths from Parkinson's disease